TW3 or TW-3 may be:

 A postcode district in the TW postal area (Twickenham, England) 
 That Was the Week That Was, a British television show
 TW3 (Albany, NY), a cable channel
 The Witcher 3: Wild Hunt, a role-playing dark fantasy video game
 Version 3 of the Tanner Whitehouse method of measuring bone age